Zangpo is a surname. Notable people with the surname include:

Rinchen Zangpo (958–1055), principal translator of Sanskrit Buddhist texts into Tibetan
Rongzom Chokyi Zangpo, scholar of the Nyingma school of Tibetan Buddhism
Takna Jigme Zangpo (1926–2020), Chinese political prisoner

Tibetan-language surnames